Antivaleria is a genus of moths of the family Noctuidae. The genus was erected by Shigero Sugi in 1958.

Species
Antivaleria viridimacula (Graeser, 1889) south-eastern Siberia, Kurile Islands, Japan
Antivaleria munda (Leech, 1900) western China
Antivaleria viridentata Hreblay & Ronkay, 1997 Taiwan
Antivaleria peregovitsi Ronkay, Ronkay, Gyulai & Hacker, 2010

References

Cuculliinae